Sagayan is a Philippine war dance performed by Maguindanao, Maranao and Iranun depicting in dramatic fashion the steps their hero, Prince Bantugan, took upon wearing his armaments, the war he fought in and his subsequent victory afterwards. Performers, depicting fierce warriors would carry shields with shell noisemakers in one hand and double-bladed sword in the other attempting rolling movements to defend their master.

See also
Darangen

References

Dances of the Philippines
War dances
Culture of Maguindanao del Norte
Culture of Maguindanao del Sur
Culture of Lanao del Sur